Sollacaro is a commune in the Corse-du-Sud department of France on the island of Corsica.

Geography
The village is located at 450 m of altitude in the Taravo valley, on the departmental road 302, linking the Celaccia gap to Pisciatello (close to Ajaccio) via Pila-Canale.

A large part of the village is on the northwest side of a hill therefore there is no morning sun except for the Torre and adjacent neighbourhoods situated on a rocky spur.

Climate
Sollacaro has a hot-summer mediterranean climate (Köppen climate classification Csa).

Population

See also
Communes of the Corse-du-Sud department

References

Communes of Corse-du-Sud